Sarbananda Sonowal is the leader of BJP, who was sworn in the Chief Minister of Assam On 24 May 2016
Here is the list of ministers:

Council of Ministers

Former Ministers

References

Assam ministries
Bharatiya Janata Party state ministries
Asom Gana Parishad
Bodoland People's Front
2016 in Indian politics
2016 establishments in Assam
Cabinets established in 2016